Kevin Brown (born January 11, 1963) is a former punter in the National Football League.

College career
Brown played college football at West Texas State and was an honorable mention Little All-America selection by the Associated Press as a senior.

Professional career
Brown was signed as an undrafted free agent in 1987 by the Chicago Bears and was originally cut at the end of training camp. He moved back to Texas and had been working as a farmer when he was re-signed by the Bears as a replacement player during the 1987 NFL players strike. Brown played in three games during the 1987 season but was released by the Bears when the strike ended.  Brown was signed by the Los Angeles Rams in the offseason, but was cut during training camp.

References

1963 births
Living people
Chicago Bears players
American football punters
West Texas A&M Buffaloes football players
National Football League replacement players
Los Angeles Rams players
People from Carson County, Texas
Players of American football from Texas